Danilo L. "Danny" Zialcita (November 24, 1939 – March 10, 2013) was a Filipino film director, writer and producer.

Early life
Zialcita was born November 24, 1939, in Manila. During his long career where he made 52 films as director, 22 of which he wrote either the story or screenplay or both, Zialcita has explored various genres that included action, drama, suspense and comedy.

Career
Some of Zialcita's films are Kapag tumabang ang asin (1976), Mga basag na kristal (1977), Anak sa una, kasal sa ina (1978), Parolado (1979), Tatlong bulaklak (1979), Nagalit ang Buwan sa Haba ng Gabi (1983) and May Lamok sa Loob ng Kulambo (1984). Zialcita made his directorial debut with Lady Killer (1965), starring the suave Romano Castellvi in the title role.

Although he is perhaps best known for Dear Heart (1981), the very first team-up of heartthrobs Sharon Cuneta and Gabby Concepcion, Zialcita had churned out several outstanding dramas way before 1981. These include Palos Strikes Again (1968), with Bernard Bonnin (the original Palos star), with whom he worked again in Bart Salamanca (1968) of the same year; films of the "bomba" genre like Gutom (1970) starring Rossana Marquez and Hidhid (1971) starring Rosanna Ortiz and Annabelle Rama; adult dramas like Lakaki, babae kami (1977), with Pinky de Leon, Chanda Romero, Janet Bordon, Alona Alegre, George Estregan, Eddie Garcia, Raoul Aragonn and Tommy Abuel; Hindi sa iyo ang mundo, Baby Porcuna (1978), topbilled by Beth Bautista, with Joseph Sytangco, Dick Israel, Anthony Alonzo, Josephine Garcia, Suzanne Gonzales; Ikaw at ang gabi (1979) with Dindo Fernando, Chanda Romero, Ronaldo Valdez and Beth Bautista; Kaladkarin (1980) with Jean Saburit in her first lead role, supported by Eddie Garcia, Suzanne Gonzales and George Estregan; and Langis at tubig (1980) with Vilma Santos, Dindo Fernando, Amy Austria, Ruben Rustia, Greg Lozano, Suzanne Gonzales, George Estregan, Ronaldo Valdez and Vic Silayan.

He was also noted for homosexual-themed fare like Si malakas si maganda at si mahinhin (1980), starring Elizabeth Oropesa, Alma Moreno, Dindo Fernando, George Estregan, Rudy Fernandez, Leonor Vergara, Mario Escudero and Mary Walter; Mahinhin vs. mahinhin (1981) with Dindo Fernando and Ronaldo Valdez in drag, costarring Edu Manzano, Carmi Martin, Dante Rivero and Pinky de Leon; Lalakwe (1985) starring Ronaldo Valdez, with Gloria Diaz, Rio Locsin, Tommy Abuel, Lyka Ugarte, Chanda Romero, Michael de Mesa, Eddie Arenas, Odette Khan, Lucita Soriano, Virginia Montes and Suzanne Gonzales; and the controversial cult classic T-Bird at Ako (1982), considered the landmark team-up of ultimate rivals Nora Aunor and Vilma Santos. Where in the hand of a lesser auteur the portrayal of gay people, transvestites, bisexuals and the like would be stereotyped caricatures, Zialcita directed such fare with class and panache.

Timely with today's proliferation of video scandals, Zialcita directed, seemingly with foresight about society's voyeuristic tendencies, The Betamax Story (1981), starring Vilma Santos, with Pinky de Leon, Cherie Gil, Alma Moreno, Jean Saburit, Chichay, Elizabeth Oropesa, George Estregan and Beth Bautista. He was also famous for films with kilometric and naughty titles; witness Nang masugatan ang gabi (1984), Hawakan mo at pigilan ang kanahon (1984), May daga sa labas ng lungga (1984), Menudo at pandesal (1985) starring Gloria Diaz, Carmi Martin, Tanya Gomez, Janice de Belen, Paquito Diaz, Max Alvarado, Lou Veloso and Caridad Sanchez; Bakit manipis ang ulap (1985) with Chanda Romero, Laurice Guillen, Tommy Abuel, Mark Gil and Janice de Belen; and Bakit madalas ang tibok ng puso? (1986), featuring the then-popular love team of Aga Muhlach and Janice de Belen, costarring Dante Rivero, Liza Lorena, Laurice Guillen, Anita Linda, Isabel Granada, Odette Khan, Johnny Vicar and Joonee Gamboa. Zialcita would go on to direct Cuneta for the second and last time in To Love Again (1983), the title based on a song written by Odette Quesada, which also marked the film debut of Miguel Rodriguez. He worked a second time with Concepcion in what would turn out to be his swan song, Bakit iisa ang pag-ibig (1987), which starred Snooky Serna.

Historians, film critics and the stars themselves attested that Zialcita liked his movie characters well-dressed, and the term "glossy melodrama" was famously coined for him in the 1980s. While Brocka's films chronicled poverty, squalor and struggle, Zialcita's movies were often about the well-heeled and their neuroses and quirks. His leading ladies often wore outlandish dresses and beautiful hats for scenes that would become the "Zialcita trademark."

Plans were afoot for Zialcita to direct again, before his untimely demise in March of this year. In a 2009 interview with Jerome Gomez for Metro Him magazine of ABS-CBN Publishing, Zialcita was all set to reprise Dear Heart (1981) (maybe with new actors), and he wanted to direct Sharon Cuneta and daughter KC Concepcion together, probably with John Lloyd Cruz as Concepcion's love interest. Zialcita and Gabby Concepcion's father were also touching base to develop a film for Gabby, in the vein of The Thorn Birds (1983 American TV mini-series).

Zialcita received the Best Screenplay award from the Filipino Academy of Movie Arts and Sciences (FAMAS) for his collaboration with Tom Adrales on Gaano kadalas ang minsan? (1982). He was cited by the Metro Manila Film Festival (MMFF) for Best Story, for Langis at tubig (1980). He was nominated by URIAN twice for screenplay and direction, for Hindi sa iyo ang mundo, Baby Porcuna (1978) and Ikaw at ang gabi (1979). The FAMAS nominated him four times as best director, Hindi sa iyo ang mundo, Baby Porcuna (1978), Langis at tubig (1980), Gaano kadalas ang minsan? (1982) and Bakit manipis ang ulap (1985), and once as Best Scriptwriter for Nang masugatan ang gabi (1984).

Death
Zialcita died on March 10, 2013, after suffering a stroke. He was 73 years old.

Awards

FAMAS Awards

Gawad Urian Awards

Metro Manila Film Festival

Cinema One Original

Filmography

Director

Writer

TV Writer

Producer

Executive Producer

References

External links

1939 births
2013 deaths
Filipino film directors
Filipino film producers
Filipino screenwriters
Filipino writers
People from Manila